The Mini Paceman is a three-door subcompact luxury crossover SUV manufactured and marketed by Mini. It is the three-door counterpart of the R60 Mini Countryman. It was introduced as the Paceman Concept at the 2011 North American International Auto Show. The production model debuted in September 2012.

Like the Countryman, the Paceman was offered with a choice of two or four-wheel drive (known as ALL4), and with 1.6-litre petrol or diesel and 2.0-litre diesel inline four engines in various states of tune. Unlike most of the Mini range, the Paceman was not manufactured in the UK but in Graz, Austria, by Magna Steyr, along with the Countryman.

BMW ended production of the Paceman in late 2016 as BMW executives felt it was positioned too close to the Countryman in Mini’s line-up.

Models

The model derivatives followed a similar pattern to the Mini Hatch, with a choice of Cooper/Cooper D, Cooper S/Cooper SD and John Cooper Works derivatives.

The Cooper Petrol  and the Cooper D , the Cooper S Petrol , the John Cooper Works  and the Cooper SD Diesel producing . The availability of models varied between markets.

The All4 all-wheel drive option was available on variable models depending on the market.

References

Paceman
Cars introduced in 2012
Mini sport utility vehicles
Luxury crossover sport utility vehicles
Front-wheel-drive vehicles
All-wheel-drive vehicles
Cars of Austria